Football in the Maldives is run by the Football Association of Maldives (FAM). The association administers the national football team as well as the national league. Football is one of the most popular sports in the country.

Maldives stadiums

References